Aki Olavi Kaurismäki (born 4 April 1957) is a Finnish film director and screenwriter. He is best known for the award-winning Drifting Clouds (1996), The Man Without a Past (2002), Le Havre (2011) and The Other Side of Hope (2017), as well as for the mockumentary Leningrad Cowboys Go America (1989). He is described as Finland's best-known film director.

Career
After graduating in media studies from the University of Tampere, Kaurismäki worked as a bricklayer, postman, and dish-washer, long before pursuing his interest in cinema, first as a critic, and later as a screenwriter & director.  He started his career as a co-screenwriter and actor in films made by his older brother, Mika Kaurismäki. He played the main role in Mika's film The Liar (1981). Together they founded the production company Villealfa Filmproductions and later the Midnight Sun Film Festival. His debut as an independent director was Crime and Punishment (1983), an adaptation of Dostoyevsky's novel set in modern Helsinki. He gained worldwide attention with Leningrad Cowboys Go America (1989). In 1989 he emigrated with his wife, Paula Oinonen, to Portugal, saying "in all of Helsinki there is no place left where I could place my camera". In 1992, the New York Times film critic Vincent Canby declared Kaurismäki “an original ... one of cinema’s most distinctive and idiosyncratic new artists, and possibly one of the most serious.... [He] could well turn out to be the seminal European filmmaker of the ’90s.”

Style 
Kaurismäki is known for his extremely minimalistic style. He has been called an auteur, since he writes, directs, produces and usually edits the films himself, and thus introduces his personal "drollery and deadpan" style. The camera is usually still. Events are shown in a plain manner and characters are usually left alone facing the consequences. However, despite their tragedies and setbacks, the characters don't give up and eventually survive.

Much of Kaurismäki's work is centred on Helsinki, such as the film Calamari Union, the Proletariat trilogy (Shadows in Paradise, Ariel and The Match Factory Girl) and the Finland trilogy (Drifting Clouds, The Man Without a Past and Lights in the Dusk). His vision of Helsinki is critical and singularly unromantic. Indeed, his characters often speak about how they wish to get away from Helsinki. Some end up in Mexico (Ariel), others in Estonia (Shadows in Paradise, Calamari Union, and Take Care of Your Scarf, Tatjana). Kaurismäki also uses, on purpose, characters, elements and settings that hark back to the 1960s and 1970s.

Kaurismäki has been influenced by the French directors Jean-Pierre Melville, Jacques Becker, and Robert Bresson, the Japanese director Yasujirō Ozu, the American director John Cassavetes, and some critics have also inferred the influence of Rainer Werner Fassbinder. His movies have a humorous side that can also be seen in the films of Jim Jarmusch, who has a cameo in Kaurismäki's film Leningrad Cowboys Go America. Jarmusch used actors who have appeared frequently in Kaurismäki's films in his own film Night on Earth, part of which takes place in Helsinki.

Kaurismäki has been a vocal critic of digital cinematography, calling it "a devil's invention" and saying he "won't make a digital film in this life". In March 2014, however, he reconciled, saying that "in order to maintain my humble film oeuvre accessible to a potential audience, I have ended up in rendering it to digital in all its present and several of its as yet unknown forms."

In Helsinki, Kaurismäki is the co-owner of a complex, Andorra, that incorporates a cinema, several bars and a pool hall featuring a giant poster for Robert Bresson’s L’Argent. It also features the jukebox from Leningrad Cowboys Meet Moses.

Awards and protests
Kaurismäki's film Ariel (1988) was entered into the 16th Moscow International Film Festival where it won the Prix FIPRESCI.

Kaurismäki's most acclaimed film has been The Man Without a Past, which won the Grand Prix and the Prize of the Ecumenical Jury at the 2002 Cannes Film Festival and was nominated for an Academy Award in the Best Foreign Language Film category in 2003. However, Kaurismäki refused to attend the Oscar ceremony, asserting that he did not feel like partying in a country that was in a state of war. Kaurismäki's next film Lights in the Dusk was also chosen to be Finland's nominee for best foreign-language film, but Kaurismäki again boycotted the awards and refused the nomination, as a protest against U.S. President George W. Bush's foreign policy. In 2002 Kaurismäki also boycotted the 40th New York Film Festival in a show of solidarity with the Iranian director Abbas Kiarostami, who was not given a US visa in time for the festival.

Kaurismäki's 2017 film The Other Side of Hope won the Silver Bear for Best Director award at the 67th Berlin International Film Festival. At the same festival he also announced that it would be his last film as a director.

List of awards
Silver Bear2016 The Other Side of HopeCannes Grand Prix2002 The Man Without a PastCannes Ecumenical Jury Special Mention1996 Drifting CloudsCannes Prize of the Ecumenical Jury2002 The Man Without a PastFIPRESCI Award2011 Le HavreJussi for Best Film2006 Lights in the DuskJussi for Best Debut Film1983 Crime and PunishmentJussi for Best Script1983 Crime and Punishment1996 Drifting Clouds2002 The Man Without a Past2011 Le HavreJussi for Best Direction1990 The Match Factory Girl1992 La vie de bohème1996 Drifting Clouds2002 The Man Without a PastSão Paulo Audience Award for Best Feature1996 Drifting Clouds

Political views
In December 2019, along with 42 other leading cultural figures, Kaurismäki signed a letter endorsing the Labour Party under Jeremy Corbyn's leadership in the 2019 general election. The letter stated that "Labour's election manifesto under Jeremy Corbyn's leadership offers a transformative plan that prioritises the needs of people and the planet over private profit and the vested interests of a few."

Kaurismäki deals with the European migrant crisis without avoiding difficult aspects of reality. "I would like to change the Finns' attitude," said the filmmaker in Berlin. When 20,000 Iraqis came to Finland, many people in the country "perceived that as an attack, like a war." He was alarmed by their reaction and decided to make a film dealing with the issue. "I respect Mrs. Merkel," he also said of the German chancellor, who was harshly criticized for her open-door refugee policy, "She is the only politician who seems to be at least interested in the problem."

In a 2007 interview with the film scholar Andrew Nestingen, Kaurismäki said: "The real disgrace here is Finland’s refugee policy, which is shameful. We refuse refugee status on the flimsiest of grounds and send people back to secure places like Darfur, Iraq, and Somalia. It’s perfectly safe, go ahead. Our policy is a stain among the Nordic nations. Shameful."

The political context of Kaurismäki's work is very much influenced by his attitude to Finland's treatment of the working class. In his view, the social and political ramifications of class structures and lack of economic parity render lower-class workers replaceable cogs in an outdated machine.

Filmography

Feature films

Crime and Punishment, 1983
Calamari Union, 1985
Shadows in Paradise, 1986
Hamlet Goes Business, 1987
Ariel, 1988
Likaiset kädet (Les mains sales), 1989 (production for Finnish TV)
Leningrad Cowboys Go America, 1989
The Match Factory Girl, 1990
I Hired a Contract Killer, 1990
La Vie de Bohème, 1992
Take Care of Your Scarf, Tatiana, 1994
Leningrad Cowboys Meet Moses, 1994
Drifting Clouds, 1996
Juha, 1999
The Man Without a Past, 2002
Lights in the Dusk, 2006
Le Havre, 2011
The Other Side of Hope, 2017
Dead Leaves, 2023 (post-production)

Documentaries
The Saimaa Gesture, 1981
Total Balalaika Show, 1994
 Juice Leskinen & Grand Slam: Bluesia Pieksämäen asemalla, 2013 (18 min)

Short films
Rocky VI, 1986 (8 min)
Thru the Wire, 1987 (6 min)
Rich Little Bitch, 1987 (6 min)
L.A. Woman, 1987 (5 min)
Those Were The Days, 1991 (5 min)
These Boots, 1992 (5 min)
Oo aina ihminen, 1995 (5 min)
Välittäjä, 1996 (4 min)
Dogs Have No Hell, 2002 (10 minute episode in the collaborative film Ten Minutes Older - The Trumpet)
Bico, 2004 (5 minute episode in the collaborative film Visions of Europe)
The Foundry, 2006 (3 minute episode in the collaborative film To Each His Own Cinema)
Tavern Man, 2012 (14 minute episode in the collaborative film Centro Histórico)

As an actor
The Liar (1981)
The Worthless (1982)
Huhtikuu on kuukausista julmin (1983)
Apinan vuosi (1983)
Viimeiset rotanrahat (1985)
Calamari Union (1985)
Ylösnousemus (1985)
Shadows in Paradise (1986)
Rocky VI (1986)
I Hired a Contract Killer (1990)
Shit Happens (1992)
Leningrad Cowboys Meet Moses (1994)
Iron Horsemen (1994)
Mustasilmä-Susanna ja lepakkoluolan aarre (1996)
Aaltra (2004)
Vandaleyne (2015)

See also
Finnish cinema

References

Sources
Roger Connah K/K: A Couple of Finns and Some Donald Ducks: Cinema and Society. VAPK Pub., Helsinki, 1991
 Pilar Carrera: "El cineasta que vino del frío (Bico-Visión)" ("The moviemaker who came in from the cold"):

External links

Aki Kaurismäki by Orimattila Town Library.

Aki Kaurismaki on Eurochannel with A Film and Its Era: Le Havre
All films by Aki Kaurismäki provided online (gratis) by YLE

1957 births
Living people
People from Orimattila
Finnish film directors
20th-century Finnish people
Finnish expatriates in Portugal
 01
Recipients of the Legion of Honour
Silver Bear for Best Director recipients